Lara Arruabarrena and Caroline Garcia were the defending champions, but they both chose to participate in Fed Cup ties this year.
Paula Cristina Gonçalves and Beatriz Haddad Maia won the title, defeating Irina Falconi and Shelby Rogers in the final, 6–3, 3–6, [10–6].

Seeds

Draw

Draw

References 
 Main draw

Copa Colsanitas - Doubles
2015 Doubles